The Parish of St. Stanislaus the Bishop and Martyr in Suszec is a Catholic parish in the Suszec deanery.

History 

The parish was first mentioned in the 1326 register of the Oświęcim deanery of the Cracow diocese as Susechz and again in 1327 as Susecz. In the next censuses of feast days from 1346 to 1358 Susecz, Susecz, Suczecz. Around 1350 the Pszczyna deanery was created and it was subordinate to the diocese of Kraków until 1821, when by virtue of the papal bull De salute animarum of 17 July it was attached to the diocese of Wrocław.

In November 1598, a church inspection (the first after the Council of Trent) of the Pszczyna deanery was conducted by the archdeacon of Krakow, Krzysztof Kazimirski, commissioned by bishop Jerzy Radziwiłł. According to the report, the church in Villa Susiecz was in the hands of Lutherans.

In 1693 the main altar was consecrated to St. Stanislaus, but since 1703 there have been paintings of the Apostles James and Philip. The right altar was then dedicated to the Mother of God, and the left one to St. Barbara. On the tower hung two bronze bells: St. Stanislaus and St. John of Nepomuk.

As a result of a fire on May 22, 1770 the entire church burned down. In its place, Rev. Provincial Osiecki built a timber barracks out of his own pocket, which served as a religious building until about 1800.As a result of moving the cemetery from the church square, a new church was built. The work was completed in 1804. The altar was dedicated to St. Stanislaus, and in 1884 three side altars appeared: the Blessed Virgin Mary, St. John of Nepomuk, and St. Anthony of Padua.

In 1895, the church burned down again. It was rebuilt by 1898 and consecrated in 1913.

Through battles during World War II, the tower was destroyed. It was rebuilt in 1947. Over time, the church was repaired (ceiling, fence, sheet metal on the roof) and new rooms were added.

References 

Catholicism in Poland